Aidil Sholeh Ali Sadikin (born 9 January 2000) is a Malaysian badminton player. He was among the players that helped Malaysia win a silver in the 2017 BWF World Junior Championships mixed team.

Career 
Aidil finished as runner-up at the 2019 Hellas Open after losing in the final to compatriot Lim Chong King. He also won silver in the team event at the 2019 Southeast Asian Games. In 2021, he was selected as a backup player for the Malaysian squad that participated in the 2021 Sudirman Cup. Later that same year, he reached the semifinals of the Scottish Open.

In 2022, Aidil was also selected for the Malaysian men's team at the Badminton Asia Team Championships. He was chosen as the second singles player in the group stage tie against Japan.

Achievement

BWF International Series (2 runners-up) 
Men singles

  BWF International Challenge tournament
  BWF International Series tournament
  BWF Future Series tournament

References

External links 
 

2000 births
Living people
People from Selangor
Malaysian people of Malay descent
Malaysian Muslims
Malaysian male badminton players
Southeast Asian Games silver medalists for Malaysia
Southeast Asian Games medalists in badminton
Competitors at the 2019 Southeast Asian Games
21st-century Malaysian people